The Middle River is a  river in the U.S. state of Virginia.  Flowing entirely within Augusta County, the Middle River joins the North River, which in turn meets the South River at Port Republic to form the South Fork Shenandoah River.

See also
List of rivers of Virginia

References

External links

USGS Hydrologic Unit Map - State of Virginia (1974)

Rivers of Virginia
Tributaries of the Shenandoah River
Rivers of Augusta County, Virginia